Oh Kyo-moon (born March 2, 1972) is an archer from South Korea.

He won a team silver medal and an individual bronze medal at the 1996 Summer Olympics. Oh also was a member of Korea's gold medal men's archery team at the 2000 Summer Olympics. In the men's individual competition, he finished sixth.

He was the world record holder for a single FITA with a score of 1379. That score was beaten by Oh Jin-hyek at the 2009 World Championships in Ulsan with 1386 points.

References

External links
 
 
 
 

1972 births
Living people
South Korean male archers
Olympic archers of South Korea
Archers at the 1996 Summer Olympics
Archers at the 2000 Summer Olympics
Olympic gold medalists for South Korea
Olympic silver medalists for South Korea
Olympic bronze medalists for South Korea
Olympic medalists in archery
Asian Games medalists in archery
Archers at the 1994 Asian Games
Archers at the 1998 Asian Games
Medalists at the 2000 Summer Olympics
Medalists at the 1996 Summer Olympics
Asian Games gold medalists for South Korea
Medalists at the 1994 Asian Games
Medalists at the 1998 Asian Games
20th-century South Korean people
21st-century South Korean people